The 1979-80 Northern League season was the 14th season of the Northern League, the top level ice hockey league in northern England and Scotland. Nine teams participated in the league, and the Murrayfield Racers won the championship. The top four teams qualified for the Spring Cup, which served as the Northern League playoffs.

Regular season

Spring Cup

Semifinals
Billingham Bombers - Whitley Warriors 9:7, 5:3
Murrayfield Racers - Glasgow Dynamos 7:2, 8:1

Final
The final between the Murrayfield Racers and the Billingham Bombers was not contested.

External links
 Season on hockeyarchives.info

Northern
Northern League (ice hockey, 1966–1982) seasons